Eustratius of Nicaea (c. 1050/1060 – c. 1120) was Metropolitan bishop of Nicaea in the early 12th century. He wrote commentaries on Aristotle's second book of the Analytica Posteriora and the Ethica Nicomachea.

Biography
Eustratius was a pupil of John Italus, although he had deliberately dissociated himself from John's supposed heretical views when John was condemned around 1082. A few years after the trial of Italus, he wrote a dialogue and treatise on the use of icons directed against Leo, the bishop of Chalcedon, who had accused the emperor Alexios I Komnenos of sacrilege and iconoclasm in the way in which he had stripped the churches of gold to fund his wars. For this he gained the emperor Alexios I's friendship, and this probably helped him to become Metropolitan bishop of Nicaea. Eustratius was said by Anna Comnena to have been wise both in mundane and in religious matters and especially expert in argument. Nevertheless he found himself accused of heresy in 1117 and a charge was placed before the Synod of Constantinople which narrowly succeeded despite a defence by Patriarch John IX of Constantinople. As a result of the condemnation Eustratius was formally suspended for life.

Two commentaries by Eustratius on the works of Aristotle survive:
Commentary on the Posterior Analytics, book 2
Commentary on the Nicomachean Ethics, books 1 and 6, found in vol. 20 of Commentaria in Aristotelem Graeca (CAG).

Notes

12th-century Byzantine bishops
11th-century philosophers
12th-century philosophers
Byzantine philosophers
Commentators on Aristotle
Bishops of Nicaea
Alexios I Komnenos
11th-century Byzantine writers
12th-century Byzantine writers
11th-century Greek people
12th-century Greek people
11th-century Greek philosophers
11th-century Greek writers
11th-century Greek educators
12th-century Greek philosophers
12th-century Greek writers
12th-century Greek educators